The white-eared bronze cuckoo (Chrysococcyx meyerii) is a species of cuckoo in the family Cuculidae.
It is found in New Guinea.

References

white-eared bronze cuckoo
Birds of New Guinea
white-eared bronze cuckoo
Taxonomy articles created by Polbot
Taxobox binomials not recognized by IUCN